Jolana was a Czechoslovakian guitar manufacturing company that produced electric guitars and basses from 1960 to near 1989. Especially during the 1960s it supposedly gained popularity in the United Kingdom, with some famous musicians (like George Harrison, Jimmy Page and Eric Clapton) using its guitar models.

Nowadays, Jolana guitars are manufactured by New Bohemian Electronics (NBE), which acquired the rights for the brand in 2003.

History 
The history of musical instruments manufacturing in former Czechoslovakia started when engineer Ferdinand Machalek created the first piano pickup in the middle 1940s. The origins of the first electric guitars date back to 1953, when the Rezonet factory managed by Josef Ruzicka designed the first instruments in the country. The company manufactured not only guitars but other wooden goods, including furniture. Designer Vladimir Vlcek created the first model, a lap steel named "Akord" which came into production in 1954. It was followed by other Rezonet's guitars, "Arioso" and "Arco". Those models became commercial success, being also awarded at the Expo 58 in Brussels.

The "Grazioso", a model based on the Fender Stratocaster, was an immediate success not only in Czechoslovakia but outside the country. The model was exported by Rezonet under the name "Futurama", with notable musicians such as George Harrison, Jimmy Page and Eric Clapton among its users.

In 1959, a new guitar factory, Neoton, opened in Hradec Králové. Managed by Ruzicka, it was soon renamed into "Jolana" –probably after Ruzicka's daughter name–. The first Jolana guitar was made in 1960. Semi-acoustic models ("Diskant" and the successful "Tornado" in 1963, then followed by the "Alexandra") were also designed by Jolana, expanding its offer. Moreover, "Alexis" and "Pampero" (basses versions of Alexandra and Tornado models) came out in 1965. That same year, a new solid body guitar was introduced, the "Hurricane", with its bass version, "Typhoon", in 1965.

The Harmonika company was in charge of Tornado production in the city of Hořovice. By the second half of the 1960s, three major factories produced electric guitars in the CSSR: CSHN, Varhany Krnov and the aforementioned Harmonika. 1975 marked the beginning of production of Jolana guitars in Harmonika Horovice factory. Jolana continued making electric guitars and basses until the end of the 1980s, developing models such as "Diamant" –a Gibson Les Paul copy.

Harmonika (later known as "Delicia") started to manufacture several models such as Cavallero, Tornado, Basora, Diskant 2, Marina 2, Onyx, Jantar, Strat, Studio and Studio Bass. In 1993, Delicia was acquired by "Bohemia Musico S.R.O.", becoming "Bohemia Musico Delicia". The company started producing guitars for renewed foreign brands such as Epiphone, Hohner, Spector, American Showster, MTD and others. 

In 2003, "New Bohemian Electronics Corp" (NBE), a manufacturing company established two years before, bought the brand "Jolana" to Delicia, which therefore ceased to produce guitars, focusing on other instruments. NBE is currently the largest manufacturer of electric string instruments in Europe. After that, NBE resumed the production of some Jolana guitar models (Grazioso, Tornado, Diamant), keeping active up to present days.

Models 

A peculiarity of some models is that the same body was used for guitar and bass, which reduced production costs. Nevertheless, the two versions differ in scale of their neck and the specific hardware.

 Chord
 Basso V
 Neoton
 Marina
 Basora
 Alexandra
 Alexis II
 Basso IV
 Pedro
 Star VII
 Sirius
 Star
 Big Beat
 Hurricane
 Diskant
 Alfa
 Star IX
 Basso IX
 Basso X
 Tornado
 Graziela special II
 Special
 Rubin: Guitar + Bass
 Kolorbas
 Studio: Guitar + Bass
 Diamant: Guitar + Bass
 Onyx
 Vikomt: Guitar + Bass
 Iris: Guitar + Bass
 Altro
 Superstar: Guitar + Bass
 Disco: Guitar + Bass
 Galaxis : Guitar + Bass
 Jantar: Guitar + Bass
 D Bass
 Strat
 Proxima: Guitar + Bass
 RK120
 RK140
 RK Bass

References

External links 

 Jolana Futurama series –illustrated history of Jolana Futurama guitars series
 Hungarian Jolana blog –refurbishing and collecting vintage Jolana guitars

Guitar manufacturing companies
Musical instrument manufacturing companies of the Czech Republic